Julianna Alba Pacheco Torres (born June 28, 2002) is a Puerto Rican footballer who plays as a midfielder for Mexican Liga MX Femenil club Santos Laguna and the Puerto Rico women's national team.

Early life
Pacheco was born in San Antonio, Texas to an American father and a Puerto Rican mother. Her paternal grandparents were also born in Puerto Rico.

Club career
Pacheco has played for Santos Laguna in Mexico.

International career
Pacheco made her senior debut for Puerto Rico at senior level on October 23, 2021, in a 2–1 friendly home win over Guyana.

References

External links
 
 
 

2002 births
Living people
Puerto Rican women's footballers
Women's association football midfielders
Santos Laguna (women) players
Liga MX Femenil players
Puerto Rico women's international footballers
Puerto Rican expatriate women's footballers
Puerto Rican expatriate sportspeople in Mexico
Expatriate women's footballers in Mexico
Soccer players from San Antonio
American women's soccer players
American expatriate women's soccer players
American expatriate sportspeople in Mexico
American sportspeople of Puerto Rican descent